Wekesa is a surname. Notable people with the surname include:

Amos Wekesa (born 1973), Ugandan businessman, entrepreneur, and corporate executive 
Noah Wekesa (born 1936), Kenyan politician
Paul Wekesa (born 1967), Kenyan tennis player
Peter Wekesa (born 1961), Kenyan sprinter